Do You is the seventh studio album from Scottish singer Sheena Easton. It was originally released in November 1985 by EMI Records, and later reissued and remastered by One Way Records in 2000, with additional b-sides and extended mixes. The album was produced by (Chic's) Nile Rodgers. Not as successful as her previous album, Do You peaked at number 40 in the US, but was certified gold and featured the top 30 hit "Do It for Love".

Overview  
Having reached a peak of success with her previous album A Private Heaven, Easton's record company secured the services of top producer Nile Rodgers to work with her on the follow-up album. Rodgers himself was also riding a career high at the time as a producer having recently worked with Madonna on her top-selling album Like a Virgin.

Of the songs chosen, Rodgers composed two ("Magic of Love" and "Money Back Guarantee"), while hit singer/songwriters Adele Bertei and Junior Giscombe contributed "Do It for Love" and "Don't Turn Your Back" respectively. The latter was later featured in an episode of the Miami Vice television series in 1988. A cover of the Martha and the Vandellas 1967 hit "Jimmy Mack" was also included. The sound of the album was a departure from her pop sound and had a more dance/club feel. While a popular album with her fans, Easton wasn't happy with the results, later commenting: "Looking back, it was a huge mistake. I think as artists we just didn't gel and it's the album I'm most disappointed by."

Released in November 1985, the album was preceded by the single "Do It for Love", which made the US top 30, peaking at number 29 in December. The album entered the Billboard 200 on November 23 and a month later peaked at number 40 during a 19-week run. By the end of the year, it was certified Gold by the RIAA. Later singles released were: "Jimmy Mack" and "Magic of Love", the former peaking at number 65 in February 1986. In her native UK, however, the album was unsuccessful. Easton puts this down to the British view that she had abandoned her country for success in America. Neither the singles nor the album registered on the chart, with her only chart showing in 1985 being for the earlier single "Sugar Walls" at number 95. Do You did however chart at number 32 in Japan and number 66 in Canada.

The album received a favorable retrospective review by Allmusic, stating that "Easton consistently delivers driven, top-of-the-line performances, resulting in her sounding much more comfortable with dance material than on previous efforts". It lists the best songs as being the non-singles "Don't Break My Heart", "When the Lightning Strikes Again" and "Money Back Guarantee".

On February 23, 2013, Edsel Records (UK) reissued and remastered Easton's A Private Heaven and Do You on CD with bonus tracks, with the latter including an extended version of "Jimmy Mack" that had never been included on any of her reissues.

Due to her next album No Sound But a Heart failing to achieve a release in the United States, Do You would be Easton's last widely available album in the U.S. until 1988's The Lover in Me.

Track listing
Side One
 "Do It for Love" (Adele Bertei, Mary Kessler) – 5:03
 "Don't Break My Heart" (Danny Ironstone, Tony Maiden, Mary Unobsky) – 3:47
 "Magic of Love" (Nile Rodgers) – 5:05
 "Don't Turn Your Back" (Gordon Gaynor, Mel Gaynor, Junior Giscombe) – 5:29
 "Jimmy Mack" (Lamont Dozier, Eddie Holland, Brian Holland) – 4:12
Side Two
 "Can't Wait Till Tomorrow" (John Keller, Geoffrey Leib, Rick Neigher) – 4:47
 "Young Lions" (Dana Merino) – 4:54
 "Kisses" (Larry Nacht) – 4:03
 "Money Back Guarantee" (Martin Celay, Nile Rodgers) – 4:34
 "When The Lightning Strikes Again" (Dan Hartman, Charlie Midnight) – 5:10

The CD re-issue featured the following bonus tracks:
 "Do It for Love" (Extended Mix) (Bertei, Kesler) – 7:01
 "Can't Wait 'Till Tomorrow" (Extended Mix) (Keller, Leib, Neigher) – 5:20
 "Money Back Guarantee" (Edited Version) (Celay, Rodgers) – 4:03
 "Do It for Love" (Instrumental) (Bertei, Kesler) – 4:50

The Edsel CD re-issue featured the following bonus tracks:
 "Do It for Love" [Extended Mix]
 "Can’t Wait Till Tomorrow" [Extended Mix]
 "Do It for Love" [Instrumental]
 "Jimmy Mack" [Extended Version]

Personnel 
 Sheena Easton – lead and backing vocals
 Nile Rodgers – keyboards, guitars, bass, backing vocals
 James Farber – keyboards
 Rob Preuss – keyboards
 Peter Scherer – keyboards
 Kevin Jones – Synclavier programming
 Martin Celay – guitars
 Jimmy Bralower – drums
 Stan Harrison – alto saxophone
 Steve Elson – baritone saxophone
 Lenny Pickett – tenor saxophone 
 Mac Gollehon – trumpet
 Matt "Briz" Brislawn – backing vocals
 Michelle Cobbs – backing vocals
 Diane Garisto – backing vocals
 Terri Gonzalez – backing vocals
 Brenda White King – backing vocals
 Curtis King – backing vocals
 Frank Simms – backing vocals
 George Simms – backing vocals
 David Spinner – backing vocals
 Fonzi Thornton – backing vocals
 Norma Jean Wright - backing vocals

Production
 Producer – Nile Rodgers
 Production Management – Kevin Jones and Budd Tinick
 Recorded and Mixed by James Farber at Skyline Studios (New York, NY).
 Second Engineers – Scott Ansell and Knut Bøhn
 Mastered by Bob Ludwig at Masterdisk (New York, NY).
 Design – Tommy Steele at Steele Works.
 Artwork – Henry Marquez
 Photography – Phillip Dixon
 Background Photography – Alan Dockery and Paul Maxon
 Personal Management – Harriet Wasserman

Certifications

Notes 

1985 albums
Sheena Easton albums
Albums produced by Nile Rodgers
EMI Records albums